Hygrocybe aurantiosplendens, commonly known as the orange waxcap, is a gilled fungus in the family Hygrophoraceae. It mainly occurs in Europe, but is also found in Siberia, and on both the East and West coasts of North America. It is uncertain if the continental ecotypes are in fact conspecific and are sometimes treated as distinct species.

It inhabits old, unimproved, calcareous grasslands in Europe, and forests elsewhere. It is rare throughout its relatively broad range and is currently in decline due to habitat loss. It is classified as a "high diversity indicator" (HDI) species by the Joint Nature Conservation Committee (JNCC) in the U.K. because its presence indicates high-quality grasslands. It is red-listed as endangered or vulnerable in many European countries.

Taxonomy 
It was originally described in Switzerland in 1954 by R. Haller Aar, a Swedish mycologist. The genus name comes from the Greek ῦγρὁς (= moist) + κυβη (= head), referring to the moisture-retaining caps of many of the species in this genus. The specific name comes from the Latin aurantius (= orange) + splendens (= shining).

The placement of H. aurantiosplendens in the genus Hygrocybe has remained unchanged since it was named, although the synonym Hygrophorus aurantiosplendens (R.Haller Aar.) P.D.Orton is used, albeit extremely rarely.

Description 
Initially the cap is conical maturing to plano-umbonate; colored bright orange to bright red, turning yellow with age. It is 3.5-5 cm (1.5-2 in) across, smooth, slimy to viscid when wet, with translucent margins. Gills are pale yellow, narrowly adnate; stipe is yellow, white at base, sometimes tapering from the base, lacking an annulus, 6-9 cm (2-3.5 in) long; 0.5-1 cm (0.2-0.4 in) thick. The spores are 8-10 x 4-7 µm, ellipsoid, smooth, inamyloid, and the 4-spored basidia is approximately 60 µm long, with a white spore print. No distinct smell or taste.

Similar Species 
H. chlorophana, the golden waxcap, is visually similar to H. aurantiosplendens, however it is much more abundant. The gills of the former are adnexed (narrowly attached) to the stipe, not adnate; additionally, the latter often develops pruina near the top of the stipe. H. punicea is distinguished by having a rougher stem and larger spores. H. acutoconica, has a dry conical cap and longer spores; Humidicutis marginata, has a dry, pale cap and bright orange gills which contrasts with the pale gills and bright cap of H. aurantiosplendens.

Habitat and distribution 
This species, like many other members of Hygrocybe, grows in calcareous, nutrient-poor grasslands in Europe. In other localities it can be found in forests with weakly acidic to basic soil. Although Hygrocybes have been thought of as saprotrophic, new evidence points to a biotrophic or symbiotic association with moss. The fruiting body can grow individually or in clusters. 

H. aurantiosplendens is widespread in Europe yet it is very rare to uncommon throughout its range. The British Isles and Scandinavia appear to be the regions with the greatest abundance of H. aurantiosplendens, but it also occurs in Finland, Iceland, Western Russia and high elevations in Southern Europe. In Eastern North America its range extends sporadically from Maine south to Florida and west to Northern Wisconsin. On the West Coast it is largely restricted to coastal regions from Northern Washington to Central California, however this western form may be distinct enough to be considered its own species.

References 

aurantiosplendens
Fungi described in 1954
Fungi of Asia
Fungi of Europe
Fungi of North America